Vadim Afonin (born 29 September 1987) is an Uzbek-Russian footballer who plays as a defensive midfielder.

Career

Club
In February 2014 Afonin signed for Gazovik Orenburg.

On 21 June 2017, FC Anzhi Makhachkala announced the signing of Afonin on a one-year contract with an option of a second year.

He returned to FC Orenburg on 11 January 2018. On 19 February 2020 he was removed by Orenburg from their squad registered with the league.

On 2 March 2020, he returned to Uzbekistan and signed with Lokomotiv Tashkent.

References

External links

1987 births
Living people
Sportspeople from Tashkent
Uzbekistani footballers
Uzbekistan youth international footballers
Uzbekistan under-20 international footballers
Uzbekistan international footballers
Association football midfielders
Russian footballers
Russian people of Uzbekistani descent
Expatriate footballers in Russia
Uzbekistani expatriate footballers
FC Rubin Kazan players
FC Salyut Belgorod players
FC Orenburg players
FC Anzhi Makhachkala players
PFC Lokomotiv Tashkent players
Russian Premier League players
Uzbekistan Super League players